Syntabulin, also known as SYBU, is a human gene.

References

Further reading